Fallacia is a genus of diatoms belonging to the family Sellaphoraceae.

The genus has cosmopolitan distribution.

Species:

Fallacia arenaria 
Fallacia carpentariae 
Fallacia cassubiae

References

Naviculales
Diatom genera